Anón River is a river in the municipality of Ponce, Puerto Rico. It is located in the northeastern area of the municipality. Río Anón is a tributary of Río Inabón. It has both its origin and its mouth in Barrio Anón.

Origin and course
The river originates in the mountains of the Toro Negro State Forest, in barrio Anón in Ponce, and cuts through the center of Barrio Anón.  It then feeds into Río Inabón just south of the intersection of PR-511 and Camino Jurutungo in central Barrio Anón. Río Anón has both its origin and its mouth in barrio Anón.

The following table summarizes the course of Rio Anón in terms of roads crossed. Roads are listed as the river flows from its origin in the mountains of Barrio Anón, north of the city of Ponce, to its feeding into Rio Inabón (N/A = Data not available):

Río Inabón
Río Anón becomes Río Inabón at the point just south of the intersections of PR-511 and Camino Jurutungo. After this point, Río Inabón winds its way through the hills paralleling PR-511 through barrios Anón and Real. It follows by the eastern edge of barrio Coto Laurel, and then forms the border between barrios Vayas and Capitanejo before it empties into the Caribbean Sea as Río Inabón.

See also
 List of rivers of Puerto Rico
 List of rivers of Ponce

References

External links
 USGS Hydrologic Unit Map – Caribbean Region (1974)
 Rios de Puerto Rico

Rivers of Puerto Rico
Rivers of Ponce, Puerto Rico